Central America was a unified nation at several points throughout its history, and while united, the country has used several national flags. The design of the Central American flag, a blue and white horizontal triband, was inspired by the flag of Argentina.

Flags

See also 

 Flags of successor nations
 Flag of Costa Rica
 Flag of El Salvador
 Flag of Guatemala
 Flag of Honduras
 Flag of Nicaragua

References

Citations

Bibliography

Further reading 
 

Flags introduced in 1823
Obsolete national flags